The 1930 Duquesne Dukes football team was an American football team that represented Duquesne University as an independent during the 1930 college football season. In its fourth season under head coach Elmer Layden, Duquesne compiled a 7–3 record and outscored opponents by a total of 131 to 56. The team played its home games at Forbes Field in Pittsburgh.

Schedule

References

Duquesne
Duquesne Dukes football seasons
Duquesne Dukes football